Ibón de Truchas is a lake at the winter resort of Astún in the Province of Huesca, northeastern Spain. It is a popular place for fishing and hiking.

References

Truchas
Geography of the Province of Huesca